Dua Lipa (born 1995) is an English singer and songwriter.

Dua Lipa may also refer to:
 Dua Lipa (album), by Dua Lipa, 2017
 "Dua Lipa", a song by Jack Harlow from his 2022 album Come Home the Kids Miss You
 Dua Lipa: At Your Service, a 2022 podcast by Dua Lipa

See also